Amata dilatata is a species of moth of the family Erebidae first described by Snellen in 1880. It is found on Sumatra, Nias, Peninsular Malaysia, Borneo and the Natuna Islands.

References 

dilatata
Moths described in 1880
Moths of Asia